Vegetable, veggie or veggies may refer to:

Vegetable, a nutritional and culinary term that denotes any part of a plant that is commonly consumed by people as food
Traditionally, Vegetable can also be used to designate the entire Plant kingdom
Vegetable is also used in an offhand, pejorative, informal and abbreviated sense to refer to a patient with severe brain damage, or who is in a persistent vegetative state
"Vegetable", the eighth track on Radiohead debut studio album Pablo Honey
"Vegetables (song)", a song appearing on albums by the Beach Boys and Brian Wilson
Vegetarian